Rimini Haraya Makama, is a Nigerian lawyer and business executive, who is Corporate and Government Affairs Director at Microsoft Nigeria.

Background and education
She was born in Jos, Plateau State, in the north-central part of Nigeria. She studied law at the University of Jos, graduating with a Bachelor of Laws and has a Master of Laws from the University of Reading.

Career

Rimini Haraya Makama is the Government Affairs Director – Microsoft MEA Emerging Markets. Rimini is a government affairs and public policy professional specialising in technology with an interest in Artificial Intelligence and its role in society & ethics.

She is responsible for managing the development and implementation of Microsoft's public policy initiatives at national and local levels as they relate to the company's strategic partnerships.

Prior to joining Microsoft, she was the Communications Director, Africa Practice. Prior to africapractice, she was Principal Legal Assistant in the Office of Legal Affairs at the International Criminal Police Organization – ICPO – INTERPOL in Lyon, France

Other considerations
In December 2014, Rimini Makama was named among "The 20 Youngest Power Women In Africa 2014", by Forbes.

See also
 Ada Osakwe
 Amy Jadesimi
 Adiat Disu

References

External links
Website in Microsoft Nigeria

1980s births
21st-century Nigerian lawyers
Nigerian women lawyers
University of Jos alumni
Alumni of the University of London
Alumni of the University of Reading
Nigerian business executives
Nigerian women business executives
Living people
Nigerian corporate directors